Mississauga East  was a federal and provincial electoral district in Ontario, Canada, that was represented in the House of Commons of Canada from 1988 to 2003, and in the Legislative Assembly of Ontario from 1975 to 2007. It was located in the city of Mississauga.

This riding was created in 1987 from parts of Mississauga North riding. It consisted of the eastern part of the City of Mississauga.  The electoral district was abolished by both the federal and provincial governments in 2003 when it was re-distributed into the ridings of Mississauga East—Cooksville (and provincial counterpart), Mississauga South (and provincial counterpart), and Mississauga—Brampton South (and provincial counterpart).

Members of Parliament

Members of Provincial Parliament

Federal election results

|-
  
|Liberal
|Albina Guarnieri  
|align="right"|23,055 
  
|Progressive Conservative
|Laurie Pallett 
|align="right"| 20,963
 
|New Democratic Party
|Walter Grozdanovski 
|align="right"|5,677

 
|Independent
| Adel Di Palma 
|align="right"|189

|}

|-
  
|Liberal
|Albina Guarnieri  
|align="right"| 32,470 

  
|Progressive Conservative
|Carl De Faria
|align="right"|6,514 
 
|New Democratic Party
|John Jackson 
|align="right"|1,393 

  
|Natural Law
| Geraldine Jackson 
|align="right"|  323    
 
|Independent
|Adrian Earl Crewson 
|align="right"|149 

|}

|-
  
|Liberal
|Albina Guarnieri 
|align="right"| 22,158 

  
|Progressive Conservative
| Riina Defaria 
|align="right"|  5,144 
 
|New Democratic Party
|Henry Beer
|align="right"| 1,451 

|}

Provincial election results

See also 

 List of Canadian federal electoral districts
 Past Canadian electoral districts

External links 

 Website of the Parliament of Canada
 Elections Ontario  1999 results and 2003 results

Former federal electoral districts of Ontario
Former provincial electoral districts of Ontario
Politics of Mississauga